The 2021 Gibraltar Darts Trophy was the second PDC European Tour event on the 2021 PDC Pro Tour. The tournament took place at Europa Sports Park, Gibraltar from 24–26 September 2021. It featured a field of 48 players and £140,000 in prize money, with £25,000 going to the winner.

Krzysztof Ratajski was the defending champion after defeating Dave Chisnall 8–2 in the 2019 final, with the 2020 edition being cancelled due to the COVID-19 pandemic. He lost in the quarter-finals to Mensur Suljović.

Gerwyn Price won his fifth European Tour title, the second in a row after his Hungarian Darts Trophy win, defeating Suljović 8–0 in the final.

Prize money
The prize money was unchanged from the 2019 & 2020 European Tours:

 Seeded players who lose in the second round do not receive this prize money on any Orders of Merit.

Qualification and format
The top 16 entrants from the PDC ProTour Order of Merit on 28 June automatically qualified for the event and were seeded in the second round.

The remaining 32 places went to players from six qualifying events – 24 from the Tour Card Holder Qualifier (held on 9 July), one from the UK Associate Member Qualifier (held on 9 August), one from the European Associate Member Qualifier (held on 5 July), four from the Host Nation Qualifier (as there were no Gibraltarian Tour Card holders) (held on 23 September), one from the Nordic & Baltic Associate Member Qualifier (held in early 2020, and carried over), and one from the East European Associate Member Qualifier (held in early 2020, and carried over).

The following players took part in the tournament:

Top 16
  (third round)
  (third round)
  (second round)
  (quarter-finals)
  (winner)
  (second round)
  (second round)
  (quarter-finals)
  (second round)
  (quarter-finals)
  (second round)
  (third round)
  (third round)
  (quarter-finals)
  (runner-up)
  (semi-finals)

Tour Card Qualifier
  (first round)
  (third round)
  (first round)
  (first round)
  (second round)
  (semi-finals)
  (first round)
  (first round)
  (second round)
  (first round)
  (first round)
  (first round)
  (second round)
  (third round)
  (first round)
  (first round)
  (third round)
  (second round)
  (second round)
  (second round)
  (second round)
  (second round)
  (second round)
  (first round)

UK Associate Member Qualifier
  (third round)

European Associate Member Qualifier
  (second round)

Host Nation Gibraltar Qualifier
  Justin Broton (first round)
  (first round)
  Craig Galliano (first round)
  Justin Hewitt (first round)

Nordic & Baltic Qualifier
  (second round)

East European Qualifier
  (first round)

Draw

References

2021 PDC Pro Tour
2021 PDC European Tour
2021 in Gibraltarian sport
Gibraltar Darts Trophy